A Boston butt is the slightly wedged shaped portion of the pork shoulder above the standard picnic cut which includes the blade bone and the "lean butt" (which is boneless), both extensions of the loin cut and can be used in place of the loin. Generally the pork shoulder is considered a primal cut with the picnic and butt sections being sub-primal cuts however, some sources do refer to the butt as a primary cut.

The tenderloin is closer to the rear of the hog. The shoulder is at the front.

The Boston butt gets its name simply from the fact that it is the wider end of the front shoulder. Butt is old English for “wide end” like the butt of a gun.

See also
Bondiola
Capocollo

References

Cuts of pork